The 76th United States Congress was a meeting of the legislative branch of the United States federal government, composed of the United States Senate and the United States House of Representatives. It met in Washington, D.C., from January 3, 1939, to January 3, 1941, during the seventh and eighth years of Franklin D. Roosevelt's presidency. The apportionment of seats in the House of Representatives was based on the 1930 United States census.

Both chambers had a Democratic majority - holding a supermajority in the Senate, but a greatly reduced majority in the House, thus losing the supermajority there. With President Roosevelt, the Democrats maintained an overall federal government trifecta.

The 76th is also the most recent Congress to have held a third session.

Major events

 April 9, 1939: African-American singer Marian Anderson performs before 75,000 people at the Lincoln Memorial in Washington, D.C., after having been denied the use both of Constitution Hall by the Daughters of the American Revolution, and of a public high school by the federally controlled District of Columbia.
 August 2, 1939: Albert Einstein wrote to President Franklin Roosevelt about developing the atomic bomb using uranium. This led to the creation of the Manhattan Project.
 September 5, 1939: World War II: The United States declares its neutrality in the war.
 November 4, 1939: World War II: President Roosevelt ordered the United States Customs Service to implement the Neutrality Act of 1939, allowing cash-and-carry purchases of weapons to non-belligerent nations.
 November 15, 1939: President Roosevelt laid the cornerstone of the Jefferson Memorial.
 April 1, 1940: April Fools' Day was also the census date for the 16th U.S. Census.
 May 16, 1940: World War II: President Roosevelt, addressed a joint session of Congress, asking for an extraordinary credit of approximately $900 million to finance construction of at least 50,000 airplanes per year.
 June 5, 1940: World War II: The United States Senate passes bill S4025 which allows the Department of Defense to sell outdated equipment to belligerents in wartime. In practice this allows the Roosevelt administration to sell certain navy vessels to Great Britain. The vote is watched closely by both the United Kingdom and Nazi Germany. The Nazis hope that the bill does not pass, the British hope that it will. The bill passes 67-18 in the United States Senate.
 June 10, 1940: World War II: President Roosevelt denounced Italy's actions with his "Stab in the Back" speech during the graduation ceremonies of the University of Virginia.
 July 10, 1940: World War II: The United States Senate votes to confirm Frank Knox as Secretary of the Navy. The British hope he will be confirmed as he was openly sympathetic to them. Islationist Senators such as Burton K. Wheeler and Ellison D. Smith vote against the confirmation.
 August 4, 1940: World War II: Gen. John J. Pershing, in a nationwide radio broadcast, urges all-out aid to Britain in order to defend the Americas, while Charles Lindbergh speaks to an isolationist rally at Soldier Field in Chicago.
September, 1940: The Army's 45th Infantry Division (previously a National Guard Division in Arizona, Colorado, New Mexico, and Oklahoma), was activated and ordered into federal service for 1 year, to engage in a training program in Ft. Sill and Louisiana, prior to serving in World War II.
 September 2, 1940: World War II: An agreement between America and Great Britain was announced to the effect that 50 U.S. destroyers needed for escort work would be transferred to Great Britain. In return, America gained 99-year leases on British bases in the North Atlantic, West Indies and Bermuda.
 September 26, 1940: World War II: The United States imposed a total embargo on all scrap metal shipments to Japan.
 October 16, 1940: The draft registration of approximately 16 million men began in the United States.
 October 29, 1940: The Selective Service System lottery was held in Washington, D.C.
 November 5, 1940: U.S. presidential election, 1940: Democratic incumbent Franklin D. Roosevelt defeated Republican challenger Wendell Willkie and became the United States's first and only third-term president.
 November 12, 1940: Case of Hansberry v. Lee, decided, allowing a racially restrictive covenant to be lifted.
 December 17, 1940: President Roosevelt, at his regular press conference, first  outlined his plan to send aid to Great Britain that will become known as Lend-Lease.
 December 29, 1940: Franklin D. Roosevelt, in a fireside chat to the nation, declared that the United States must become "the great arsenal of democracy."
 January 13, 1941: All persons born in Puerto Rico after this day were declared U.S. citizens by birth, through federal law .
 January 20, 1941: Chief Justice Charles Evans Hughes swore in President Roosevelt for a third term.
 January 27, 1941: World War II: U.S. Ambassador to Japan Joseph C. Grew passed on to Washington a rumor overheard at a diplomatic reception about a planned surprise attack upon Pearl Harbor, Hawaii.
 February 4, 1941: World War II: The United Service Organization (USO) was created to entertain American troops.

Hearings 
 January 23, 1941: Aviator Charles Lindbergh testified before the Congress and recommends that the United States negotiate a neutrality pact with Adolf Hitler.

Major legislation

 April 3, 1939: Reorganization Act of 1939, 
 August 2, 1939: Hatch Act of 1939 ("Hatch Political Activity Act", "An Act to Prevent Pernicious Political Activities"), ch. 410, 
 November 4, 1939: Neutrality Act of 1939, ("Cash and Carry Act"), ch. 2, 
 June 29, 1940: Alien Registration Act (Smith Act), 3d sess. ch. 439, 
 August 22, 1940: Act of August 22, 1940, ch. 686,  (including Investment Company Act of 1940, Investment Advisers Act of 1940)
 September 16, 1940: Selective Training and Service Act of 1940,

Party summary

Senate

House of Representatives

Leadership

Senate
President: John N. Garner (D)
President pro tempore: Key Pittman (D), until November 10, 1940 (died)
 William H. King (D), from November 19, 1940

Majority (Democratic) leadership 
 Majority Leader: Alben W. Barkley
 Majority Whip: Sherman Minton
 Democratic Caucus Secretary: Joshua B. Lee

Minority (Republican) leadership 
 Minority Leader: Charles McNary
 Republican Conference Secretary: Frederick Hale
 National Senatorial Committee Chair: John G. Townsend Jr.

House of Representatives
 Speaker: William B. Bankhead (D), until September 15, 1940 (died)
 Sam Rayburn (D), from September 16, 1940

Majority (Democratic) leadership 
 Majority Leader: Sam Rayburn, until September 16, 1940
 John W. McCormack, from September 16, 1940
 Democratic Whip: Patrick J. Boland
 Democratic Caucus Chairman: John W. McCormack, until September 16, 1940
 Democratic Campaign Committee Chairman: Patrick H. Drewry

Minority (Republican) leadership 
 Minority Leader: Joseph William Martin Jr.
 Republican Whip: Harry Lane Englebright
 Republican Conference Chairman: Roy O. Woodruff
 Republican Campaign Committee Chairman: J. William Ditter

Members

Senate
Senators were popularly elected statewide every two years, with one-third beginning new six-year terms with each Congress. Preceding the names in the list below are Senate class numbers, which indicate the cycle of their election, In this Congress, Class 1 meant their term ended with this Congress, requiring reelection in 1940; Class 2 meant their term began in the last Congress, requiring reelection in 1942; and Class 3 meant their term began in this Congress, requiring reelection in 1944.

Alabama 
 2. John H. Bankhead II (D)
 3. Joseph Lister Hill (D)

Arizona 
 1. Henry Fountain Ashurst (D)
 3. Carl Hayden (D)

Arkansas 
 2. John E. Miller (D)
 3. Hattie Wyatt Caraway (D)

California 
 1. Hiram Warren Johnson (R)
 3. Sheridan Downey (D)

Colorado 
 2. Edwin Carl Johnson (D)
 3. Alva Blanchard Adams (D)

Connecticut 
 1. Francis Thomas Maloney (D)
 3. John A. Danaher (R)

Delaware 
 1. John G. Townsend Jr. (R)
 2. James H. Hughes (D)

Florida 
 1. Charles Oscar Andrews (D)
 3. Claude Denson Pepper (D)

Georgia 
 2. Richard Brevard Russell (D)
 3. Walter Franklin George (D)

Idaho 
 2. William Edgar Borah (R), until January 19, 1940
 John W. Thomas (R), from January 27, 1940
 3. D. Worth Clark (D)

Illinois 
 2. James Hamilton Lewis (D), until April 9, 1939
 James M. Slattery (D), April 14, 1939 – November 21, 1940
 Charles W. Brooks (R), from November 22, 1940
 3. Scott W. Lucas (D)

Indiana 
 1. Sherman Minton (D)
 3. Frederick Van Nuys (D)

Iowa 
 2. Clyde L. Herring (D)
 3. Guy M. Gillette (D)

Kansas 
 2. Arthur Capper (R)
 3. Clyde M. Reed (R)

Kentucky 
 2. Marvel Mills Logan (D), until October 3, 1939
 Happy Chandler (D), from October 10, 1939
 3. Alben William Barkley (D)

Louisiana 
 2. Allen Joseph Ellender (D)
 3. John Holmes Overton (D)

Maine 
 1. Frederick Hale (R)
 2. Wallace H. White Jr. (R)

Maryland 
 1. George Lovic Radcliffe (D)
 3. Millard Evelyn Tydings (D)

Massachusetts 
 1. David Ignatius Walsh (D)
 2. Henry Cabot Lodge Jr. (R)

Michigan 
 1. Arthur Hendrick Vandenberg (R)
 2. Prentiss Marsh Brown (D)

Minnesota 
 1. Henrik Shipstead (FL)
 2. Ernest Lundeen (FL), until August 31, 1940
 Joseph H. Ball (R), from October 14, 1940

Mississippi 
 1. Theodore Gilmore Bilbo (D)
 2. Byron Patton Harrison (D)

Missouri 
 1. Harry S. Truman (D)
 3. Bennett Champ Clark (D)

Montana 
 1. Burton Kendall Wheeler (D)
 2. James Edward Murray (D)

Nebraska 
 1. Edward Raymond Burke (D)
 2. George William Norris (I)

Nevada 
 1. Key Denson Pittman (D), until November 10, 1940
 Berkeley L. Bunker (D), from November 27, 1940
 3. Patrick Anthony McCarran (D)

New Hampshire 
 2. Styles Bridges (R)
 3. Charles W. Tobey (R)

New Jersey 
 1. William Warren Barbour (R)
 2. William Howell Smathers (D)

New Mexico 
 1. Dennis Wyatt Chavez (D)
 2. Carl Atwood Hatch (D)

New York 
 1. James Michael Mead (D)
 3. Robert Ferdinand Wagner (D)

North Carolina 
 2. Josiah William Bailey (D)
 3. Robert Rice Reynolds (D)

North Dakota 
 1. Lynn Frazier (R-NPL)
 3. Gerald Nye (R)

Ohio 
 1. Alvin Victor Donahey (D)
 3. Robert A. Taft (R)

Oklahoma 
 2. Joshua B. Lee (D)
 3. Elmer Thomas (D)

Oregon 
 2. Charles L. McNary (R)
 3. Rufus C. Holman (R)

Pennsylvania 
 1. Joseph F. Guffey (D)
 3. James J. Davis (R)

Rhode Island 
 1. Peter Goelet Gerry (D)
 2. Theodore Francis Green (D)

South Carolina 
 2. James Francis Byrnes (D)
 3. Ellison Durant Smith (D)

South Dakota 
 2. William John Bulow (D)
 3. J. Chandler Gurney (R)

Tennessee 
 1. Kenneth D. McKellar (D)
 2. Tom Stewart (D)

Texas 
 1. Thomas Terry Connally (D)
 2. Morris Sheppard (D)

Utah 
 1. William Henry King (D)
 3. Elbert Duncan Thomas (D)

Vermont 
 1. Warren Robinson Austin (R)
 3. Ernest Willard Gibson (R), until June 20, 1940
 Ernest W. Gibson Jr. (R), from June 24, 1940

Virginia 
 1. Harry Flood Byrd (D)
 2. Carter Glass (D)

Washington 
 1. Lewis Baxter Schwellenbach (D), until December 16, 1940
 Monrad Wallgren (D), from December 19, 1940
 3. Homer Truett Bone (D)

West Virginia 
 1. Rush D. Holt Sr. (D)
 2. Matthew Mansfield Neely (D)

Wisconsin 
 1. Robert M. La Follette Jr. (P)
 3. Alexander Wiley (R)

Wyoming 
 1. Joseph Christopher O'Mahoney (D)
 2. Henry H. Schwartz (D)

House of Representatives 
The names of members are preceded by their district numbers.

Alabama 
 . Frank W. Boykin (D)
 . George M. Grant (D)
 . Henry B. Steagall (D)
 . Sam Hobbs (D)
 . Joe Starnes (D)
 . Pete Jarman (D)
 . William B. Bankhead (D), until September 15, 1940
 Zadoc L. Weatherford (D). from November 5, 1940
 . John J. Sparkman (D)
 . Luther Patrick (D)

Arizona 
 . John R. Murdock (D)

Arkansas 
 . Ezekiel C. Gathings (D)
 . Wilbur D. Mills (D)
 . Clyde T. Ellis (D)
 . William B. Cravens (D), until January 13, 1939
 William F. Cravens (D), from September 12, 1939
 . David D. Terry (D)
 . William F. Norrell (D)
 . Wade H. Kitchens (D)

California 
 . Clarence F. Lea (D)
 . Harry L. Englebright (R)
 . Frank H. Buck (D)
 . Franck R. Havenner (P)
 . Richard J. Welch (R)
 . Albert E. Carter (R)
 . John H. Tolan (D)
 . Jack Z. Anderson (R)
 . Bertrand W. Gearhart (R)
 . Alfred J. Elliott (D)
 . John Carl Hinshaw (R)
 . Jerry Voorhis (D)
 . Charles Kramer (D)
 . Thomas F. Ford (D)
 . John M. Costello (D)
 . Leland M. Ford (R)
 . Lee E. Geyer (D)
 . Thomas M. Eaton (R), until September 16, 1939
 . Harry R. Sheppard (D)
 . Edouard V. M. Izac (D)

Colorado 
 . Lawrence Lewis (D)
 . Fred N. Cummings (D)
 . John A. Martin (D), until December 23, 1939
 William E. Burney (D), from November 5, 1940
 . Edward T. Taylor (D)

Connecticut 
 . B. J. Monkiewicz (R)
 . William J. Miller (R)
 . Thomas R. Ball (R)
 . James A. Shanley (D)
 . Albert E. Austin (R)
 . J. Joseph Smith (D)

Delaware 
 . George S. Williams (R)

Florida 
 . J. Hardin Peterson (D)
 . Robert A. Green (D)
 . Millard F. Caldwell (D)
 . Pat Cannon (D)
 . Joe Hendricks (D)

Georgia 
 . Hugh Peterson (D)
 . Edward E. Cox (D)
 . Stephen Pace (D)
 . Emmett M. Owen (D), until June 21, 1939
 A. Sidney Camp (D), from August 1, 1939
 . Robert Ramspeck (D)
 . Carl Vinson (D)
 . Malcolm C. Tarver (D)
 . W. Benjamin Gibbs (D), until August 7, 1940
 Florence R. Gibbs (D), from October 1, 1940
 . B. Frank Whelchel (D)
 . Paul Brown (D)

Idaho 
 . Compton I. White (D)
 . Henry C. Dworshak (R)

Illinois 
 . John C. Martin (D)
 . Thomas V. Smith (D)
 . Arthur W. Mitchell (D)
 . Raymond S. McKeough (D)
 . Edward A. Kelly (D)
 . Harry P. Beam (D)
 . Adolph J. Sabath (D)
 . A. F. Maciejewski (D)
 . Leonard W. Schuetz (D)
 . Leo Kocialkowski (D)
 . James McAndrews (D)
 . Ralph E. Church (R)
 . Chauncey W. Reed (R)
 . Noah M. Mason (R)
 . Leo E. Allen (R)
 . Anton J. Johnson (R)
 . Robert B. Chiperfield (R)
 . Everett M. Dirksen (R)
 . Leslie C. Arends (R)
 . Jessie Sumner (R)
 . William H. Wheat (R)
 . James M. Barnes (D)
 . Frank W. Fries (D)
 . Edwin M. Schaefer (D)
 . Laurence F. Arnold (D)
 . Claude V. Parsons (D)
 . Kent E. Keller (D)

Indiana 
 . William T. Schulte (D)
 . Charles A. Halleck (R)
 . Robert A. Grant (R)
 . George W. Gillie (R)
 . Forest A. Harness (R)
 . Noble J. Johnson (R)
 . Gerald W. Landis (R)
 . John W. Boehne Jr. (D)
 . Eugene B. Crowe (D)
 . Raymond S. Springer (R)
 . William H. Larrabee (D)
 . Louis Ludlow (D)

Iowa 
 . Thomas E. Martin (R)
 . William S. Jacobsen (D)
 . John W. Gwynne (R)
 . Henry O. Talle (R)
 . Karl M. LeCompte (R)
 . Cassius C. Dowell (R), until February 4, 1940
 Robert K. Goodwin (R), from March 5, 1940
 . Ben F. Jensen (R)
 . Fred C. Gilchrist (R)
 . Vincent F. Harrington (D)

Kansas 
 . William P. Lambertson (R)
 . U. S. Guyer (R)
 . Thomas Daniel Winter (R)
 . Edward Herbert Rees (R)
 . John Mills Houston (D)
 . Frank Carlson (R)
 . Clifford R. Hope (R)

Kentucky 
 . Noble J. Gregory (D)
 . Beverly M. Vincent (D)
 . Emmet O'Neal (D)
 . Edward W. Creal (D)
 . Brent Spence (D)
 . Virgil Chapman (D)
 . Andrew J. May (D)
 . Joe B. Bates (D)
 . John M. Robsion (R)

Louisiana 
 . Joachim O. Fernandez (D)
 . Paul H. Maloney (D), until December 15, 1940
 . Robert L. Mouton (D)
 . Overton Brooks (D)
 . Newt V. Mills (D)
 . John K. Griffith (D)
 . René L. DeRouen (D)
 . A. Leonard Allen (D)

Maine 
 . James C. Oliver (R)
 . Clyde H. Smith (R), until April 8, 1940
 Margaret Chase Smith (R), from June 3, 1940
 . Ralph Owen Brewster (R)

Maryland 
 . T. Alan Goldsborough (D), until April 5, 1939
 David J. Ward (D), from June 8, 1939
 . William P. Cole Jr. (D)
 . Thomas D'Alesandro Jr. (D)
 . Ambrose J. Kennedy (D)
 . Lansdale G. Sasscer (D), from February 3, 1939
 . William D. Byron (D)

Massachusetts 
 . Allen T. Treadway (R)
 . Charles Clason (R)
 . Joseph E. Casey (D)
 . Pehr G. Holmes (R)
 . Edith Nourse Rogers (R)
 . George J. Bates (R)
 . Lawrence J. Connery (D)
 . Arthur D. Healey (D)
 . Robert Luce (R)
 . George H. Tinkham (R)
 . Thomas A. Flaherty (D)
 . John W. McCormack (D)
 . Richard B. Wigglesworth (R)
 . Joseph W. Martin Jr. (R)
 . Charles L. Gifford (R)

Michigan 
 . Rudolph G. Tenerowicz (D)
 . Earl C. Michener (R)
 . Paul W. Shafer (R)
 . Clare E. Hoffman (R)
 . Carl E. Mapes (R), until December 12, 1939
 Bartel J. Jonkman (R), from February 19, 1940
 . William W. Blackney (R)
 . Jesse P. Wolcott (R)
 . Fred L. Crawford (R)
 . Albert J. Engel (R)
 . Roy O. Woodruff (R)
 . Fred Bradley (R)
 . Frank Hook (D)
 . Clarence McLeod (R)
 . Louis C. Rabaut (D)
 . John D. Dingell Sr. (D)
 . John Lesinski Sr. (D)
 . George A. Dondero (R)

Minnesota 
 . August H. Andresen (R)
 . Elmer Ryan (D)
 . John G. Alexander (R)
 . Melvin Maas (R)
 . Oscar Youngdahl (R)
 . Harold Knutson (R)
 . H. Carl Andersen (R)
 . William Pittenger (R)
 . Rich T. Buckler (FL)

Mississippi 
 . John E. Rankin (D)
 . Wall Doxey (D)
 . William M. Whittington (D)
 . Aaron L. Ford (D)
 . Ross A. Collins (D)
 . William M. Colmer (D)
 . Dan R. McGehee (D)

Missouri 
 . Milton A. Romjue (D)
 . William L. Nelson (D)
 . Richard M. Duncan (D)
 . C. Jasper Bell (D)
 . Joseph B. Shannon (D)
 . Reuben T. Wood (D)
 . Dewey Short (R)
 . Clyde Williams (D)
 . Clarence Cannon (D)
 . Orville Zimmerman (D)
 . Thomas C. Hennings Jr. (D), until December 31, 1940
 . Charles Arthur Anderson (D)
 . John J. Cochran (D)

Montana 
 . Jacob Thorkelson (R)
 . James F. O'Connor (D)

Nebraska 
 . George H. Heinke (R), until January 2, 1940
 John Hyde Sweet (R), from April 19, 1940
 . Charles F. McLaughlin (D)
 . Karl Stefan (R)
 . Carl T. Curtis (R)
 . Harry B. Coffee (D)

Nevada 
 . James G. Scrugham (D)

New Hampshire 
 . Arthur B. Jenks (R)
 . Foster Waterman Stearns (R)

New Jersey 
 . Charles A. Wolverton (R)
 . Walter S. Jeffries (R)
 . William H. Sutphin (D)
 . D. Lane Powers (R)
 . Charles A. Eaton (R)
 . Donald H. McLean (R)
 . J. Parnell Thomas (R)
 . George N. Seger (R), until August 26, 1940
 . Frank C. Osmers Jr. (R)
 . Fred A. Hartley Jr. (R)
 . Albert L. Vreeland (R)
 . Robert W. Kean (R)
 . Mary T. Norton (D)
 . Edward J. Hart (D)

New Mexico 
 . John J. Dempsey (D)

New York 
 . Matthew J. Merritt (D)
 . Caroline O'Day (D)
 . Leonard W. Hall (R)
 . William B. Barry (D)
 . Joseph L. Pfeifer (D)
 . Thomas H. Cullen (D)
 . Marcellus H. Evans (D)
 . Andrew L. Somers (D)
 . John J. Delaney (D)
 . Donald L. O'Toole (D)
 . Eugene J. Keogh (D)
 . Emanuel Celler (D)
 . James A. O'Leary (D)
 . Samuel Dickstein (D)
 . Christopher D. Sullivan (D)
 . William I. Sirovich (D), until December 17, 1939
 Morris Michael Edelstein (D), from February 6, 1940
 . Michael J. Kennedy (D)
 . James H. Fay (D)
 . Bruce Barton (R)
 . Martin J. Kennedy (D)
 . Sol Bloom (D)
 . Vito Marcantonio (AL)
 . Joseph A. Gavagan (D)
 . Edward W. Curley (D), until January 6, 1940
 Walter A. Lynch (D), from February 20, 1940
 . Charles A. Buckley (D)
 . James M. Fitzpatrick (D)
 . Ralph A. Gamble (R)
 . Hamilton Fish (R)
 . Lewis K. Rockefeller (R)
 . William T. Byrne (D)
 . E. Harold Cluett (R)
 . Frank Crowther (R)
 . Wallace E. Pierce (R), until January 3, 1940
 Clarence E. Kilburn (R), from February 13, 1940
 . Francis D. Culkin (R)
 . Fred J. Douglas (R)
 . Bert Lord (R), until May 24, 1939
 Edwin A. Hall (R), from November 7, 1939
 . Clarence E. Hancock (R)
 . John Taber (R)
 . W. Sterling Cole (R)
 . Joseph J. O'Brien (R)
 . James W. Wadsworth Jr. (R)
 . Walter G. Andrews (R)
 . J. Francis Harter (R)
 . Pius Schwert (D)
 . Daniel A. Reed (R)

North Carolina 
 . Lindsay C. Warren (D), until October 31, 1940
 Herbert C. Bonner (D), from November 5, 1940
 . John H. Kerr (D)
 . Graham A. Barden (D)
 . Harold D. Cooley (D)
 . Alonzo D. Folger (D)
 . Carl T. Durham (D)
 . J. Bayard Clark (D)
 . William O. Burgin (D)
 . Robert L. Doughton (D)
 . Alfred L. Bulwinkle (D)
 . Zebulon Weaver (D)

North Dakota 
 . William Lemke (R-NPL)
 . Usher L. Burdick (R-NPL)

Ohio 
 . George H. Bender (R)
 . L. L. Marshall (R)
 . Charles H. Elston (R)
 . William E. Hess (R)
 . Harry N. Routzohn (R)
 . Robert Franklin Jones (R)
 . Cliff Clevenger (R)
 . James G. Polk (D)
 . Clarence J. Brown (R)
 . Frederick C. Smith (R)
 . John F. Hunter (D)
 . Thomas A. Jenkins (R)
 . Harold K. Claypool (D)
 . John M. Vorys (R)
 . Dudley A. White (R)
 . Dow W. Harter (D)
 . Robert T. Secrest (D)
 . James Seccombe (R)
 . William A. Ashbrook (D), until January 1, 1940
 J. Harry McGregor (R), from February 27, 1940
 . Earl R. Lewis (R)
 . Michael J. Kirwan (D)
 . Martin L. Sweeney (D)
 . Robert Crosser (D)
 . Chester C. Bolton (R), until October 29, 1939
 Frances P. Bolton (R), from February 27, 1940

Oklahoma 
 . Will Rogers (D)
 . Wesley E. Disney (D)
 . John Conover Nichols (D)
 . Wilburn Cartwright (D)
 . Lyle Boren (D)
 . A. S. Mike Monroney (D)
 . Jed Johnson (D)
 . Sam C. Massingale (D)
 . Phil Ferguson (D)

Oregon 
 . James W. Mott (R)
 . Walter M. Pierce (D)
 . Homer D. Angell (R)

Pennsylvania 
 . Leon Sacks (D)
 . James P. McGranery (D)
 . Michael J. Bradley (D)
 . J. Burrwood Daly (D), until March 12, 1939
 John E. Sheridan (D), from November 7, 1939
 . Fred C. Gartner (R)
 . Francis J. Myers (D)
 . George P. Darrow (R)
 . James Wolfenden (R)
 . Charles L. Gerlach (R)
 . J. Roland Kinzer (R)
 . Patrick J. Boland (D)
 . J. Harold Flannery (D)
 . Ivor D. Fenton (R)
 . Guy L. Moser (D)
 . Albert G. Rutherford (R)
 . Robert F. Rich (R)
 . J. William Ditter (R)
 . Richard M. Simpson (R)
 . John C. Kunkel (R)
 . Benjamin Jarrett (R)
 . Francis E. Walter (D)
 . Chester H. Gross (R)
 . James E. Van Zandt (R)
 . J. Buell Snyder (D)
 . Charles I. Faddis (D)
 . Louis E. Graham (R)
 . Harve Tibbott (R)
 . Robert G. Allen (D)
 . Robert L. Rodgers (R)
 . Robert J. Corbett (R)
 . John McDowell (R)
 . Herman P. Eberharter (D)
 . Joseph A. McArdle (D)
 . Matthew A. Dunn (D)

Rhode Island 
 . Charles Risk (R)
 . Harry Sandager (R)

South Carolina 
 . Thomas S. McMillan (D), until September 29, 1939
 Clara Gooding McMillan (D), from November 7, 1939
 . Hampton P. Fulmer (D)
 . Butler B. Hare (D)
 . Joseph R. Bryson (D)
 . James P. Richards (D)
 . John L. McMillan (D)

South Dakota 
 . Karl E. Mundt (R)
 . Francis Case (R)

Tennessee 
 . B. Carroll Reece (R)
 . J. Will Taylor (R), until November 14, 1939
 John Jennings Jr. (R), from December 30, 1939
 . Sam D. McReynolds (D), until July 11, 1939
 Estes Kefauver (D), from September 13, 1939
 . Albert A. Gore Sr. (D)
 . Jo Byrns Jr. (D)
 . Clarence W. Turner (D), until March 23, 1939
 W. Wirt Courtney (D), from May 11, 1939
 . Herron C. Pearson (D)
 . Jere Cooper (D)
 . Clift Chandler (D), until January 2, 1940
 Clifford Davis (D), from February 15, 1940

Texas 
 . Wright Patman (D)
 . Martin Dies Jr. (D)
 . Lindley Beckworth (D)
 . Sam Rayburn (D)
 . Hatton W. Sumners (D)
 . Luther A. Johnson (D)
 . Nat Patton (D)
 . Albert Thomas (D)
 . Joseph J. Mansfield (D)
 . Lyndon B. Johnson (D)
 . William R. Poage (D)
 . Fritz G. Lanham (D)
 . Ed Gossett (D)
 . Richard M. Kleberg (D)
 . Milton H. West (D)
 . R. Ewing Thomason (D)
 . Clyde L. Garrett (D)
 . Marvin Jones (D), until November 20, 1940
 . George H. Mahon (D)
 . Paul J. Kilday (D)
 . Charles L. South (D)

Utah 
 . Abe Murdock (D)
 . J. W. Robinson (D)

Vermont 
 . Charles A. Plumley (R)

Virginia 
 . S. Otis Bland (D)
 . Colgate Darden (D)
 . Dave E. Satterfield Jr. (D)
 . Patrick H. Drewry (D)
 . Thomas G. Burch (D)
 . Clifton A. Woodrum (D)
 . A. Willis Robertson (D)
 . Howard W. Smith (D)
 . John W. Flannagan Jr. (D)

Washington 
 . Warren G. Magnuson (D)
 . Monrad C. Wallgren (D), until December 19, 1940
 . Martin F. Smith (D)
 . Knute Hill (D)
 . Charles H. Leavy (D)
 . John M. Coffee (D)

West Virginia 
 . A. C. Schiffler (R)
 . Jennings Randolph (D)
 . Andrew Edmiston Jr. (D)
 . George William Johnson (D)
 . John Kee (D)
 . Joe L. Smith (D)

Wisconsin 
 . Stephen Bolles (R)
 . Charles Hawks Jr. (R)
 . Harry W. Griswold (R), until July 4, 1939
 . John C. Schafer (R)
 . Lewis D. Thill (R)
 . Frank B. Keefe (R)
 . Reid F. Murray (R)
 . Joshua L. Johns (R)
 . Merlin Hull (P)
 . Bernard J. Gehrmann (P)

Wyoming 
 . Frank O. Horton (R)

Non-voting members 
 . Anthony J. Dimond (D)
 . Samuel Wilder King (R)
 . Joaquin Miguel Elizalde (I)
 . Santiago Iglesias Pantín (Coalitionist), until December 5, 1939
 Bolívar Pagán (Resident Commissioner) (Soc.), from December 26, 1939

Changes in membership
The count below reflects changes from the beginning of this Congress.

Senate

|-
| Illinois(2)
| nowrap  | J. Hamilton Lewis (D)
| Died April 9, 1939.Successor appointed April 14, 1939, to continue the term.
| nowrap  | James M. Slattery (D)
| April 14, 1939

|-
| Kentucky(2)
| nowrap  | M. M. Logan (D)
| Died October 3, 1939.Successor appointed October 10, 1939, to continue the term. Successor elected November 5, 1940, to finish the term.
| nowrap  | Happy Chandler (D)
| October 10, 1939

|-
| Idaho(2)
| nowrap  | William E. Borah (R)
| Died January 19, 1940.Successor appointed January 27, 1940, to continue the term.Successor elected November 5, 1940, to finish the term.
| nowrap  | John W. Thomas (R)
| January 27, 1940

|-
| Vermont(3)
| nowrap  | Ernest W. Gibson (R)
| Died June 20, 1940.Successor appointed June 24, 1940, to continue the term.
| nowrap  | Ernest W. Gibson Jr. (R)
| June 24, 1940

|-
| Minnesota(2)
| nowrap  | Ernest Lundeen (FL)
| Died August 31, 1940.Successor appointed October 14, 1940, to continue the term.Successor lost election to finish the term.
| nowrap  | Joseph H. Ball (R)
| October 14, 1940

|-
| Nevada(1)
| nowrap  | Key Pittman (D)
| Died November 10, 1940.Successor appointed November 27, 1940, to continue finish the term, also appointed to serve in the next term.
| nowrap  | Berkeley L. Bunker (D)
| November 27, 1940

|-
| Illinois(2)
| nowrap  | James M. Slattery (D)
| Interim appointee lost election November 21, 1940, to finish the term.
| nowrap  | Charles W. Brooks (R)
| November 22, 1940

|-
| Washington(1)
| nowrap  | Lewis B. Schwellenbach (D)
| Resigned December 16, 1940, to become judge of the U.S. District Court for the Eastern District of Washington.Successor appointed December 19, 1940, to finish the term.
| nowrap  | Monrad Wallgren (D)
| December 19, 1940

|}

House of Representatives

|-
| 
| Vacant
| style="font-size:80%" | Rep. Stephen W. Gambrill died in previous Congress
|  | Lansdale Sasscer (D)
| February 3, 1939
|-
| 
|  | William B. Cravens (D)
| style="font-size:80%" | Died January 13, 1939 
|  | William F. Cravens (D)
| September 12, 1939
|-
| 
|  | J. Burrwood Daly (D)
| style="font-size:80%" | Died March 12, 1939 
|  | John E. Sheridan (D)
| November 7, 1939
|-
| 
|  | Clarence W. Turner (D)
| style="font-size:80%" | Died March 23, 1939 
|  | W. Wirt Courtney (D)
| May 11, 1939
|-
| 
|  | Thomas A. Goldsborough (D)
| style="font-size:80%" | Resigned April 5, 1939, after being appointed associate justice of the District Court of the United States for the District of Columbia 
|  | David J. Ward (D)
| June 8, 1939
|-
| 
|  | Bert Lord (R)
| style="font-size:80%" | Died May 24, 1939 
|  | Edwin A. Hall (R)
| November 7, 1939
|-
| 
|  | Emmett M. Owen (D)
| style="font-size:80%" | Died June 21, 1939 
|  | A. Sidney Camp (D)
| August 1, 1939
|-
| 
|  | Harry W. Griswold (R)
| style="font-size:80%" | Died July 4, 1939
| colspan=2 | Vacant until the next Congress
|-
| 
|  | Sam D. McReynolds (D)
| style="font-size:80%" | Died July 11, 1939 
|  | Estes Kefauver (D)
| September 13, 1939
|-
| 
|  | Thomas M. Eaton (R)
| style="font-size:80%" | Died September 16, 1939 
| colspan=2 | Vacant until the next Congress
|-
| 
|  | Thomas S. McMillan (D)
| style="font-size:80%" | Died September 29, 1939 
|  | Clara G. McMillan (D)
| November 7, 1939
|-
| 
|  | Chester C. Bolton (R)
| style="font-size:80%" | Died October 29, 1939 
|  | Frances P. Bolton (R)
| February 27, 1940
|-
| 
|  | J. Will Taylor (R)
| style="font-size:80%" | Died November 14, 1939 
|  | John Jennings Jr. (R)
| December 30, 1939
|-
| 
| Santiago Iglesias (Coalitionist)
| style="font-size:80%" | Died December 5, 1939 
| Bolívar Pagán (Socialist)
| December 26, 1939
|-
| 
|  | John A. Martin (D)
| style="font-size:80%" | Died December 23, 1939 
|  | William E. Burney (D)
| November 5, 1940
|-
| 
|  | Carl E. Mapes (R)
| style="font-size:80%" | Died December 12, 1939 
|  | Bartel J. Jonkman (R)
| February 19, 1940
|-
| 
|  | William I. Sirovich (D)
| style="font-size:80%" | Died December 17, 1939 
|  | Morris M. Edelstein (D)
| February 6, 1940
|-
| 
|  | William A. Ashbrook (D)
| style="font-size:80%" | Died January 1, 1940 
|  | J. Harry McGregor (R)
| February 27, 1940
|-
| 
|  | George H. Heinke (R)
| style="font-size:80%" | Died January 2, 1940 
|  | John H. Sweet (R)
| April 19, 1940
|-
| 
|  | Clift Chandler (D)
| style="font-size:80%" | Resigned January 2, 1940, after being elected Mayor of Memphis
|  | Clifford Davis (D)
| February 15, 1940
|-
| 
|  | Wallace E. Pierce (R)
| style="font-size:80%" | Died January 3, 1940 
|  | Clarence E. Kilburn (R)
| February 13, 1940
|-
| 
|  | Edward W. Curley (D)
| style="font-size:80%" | Died January 6, 1940 
|  | Walter A. Lynch (D)
| February 20, 1940
|-
| 
|  | Cassius C. Dowell (R)
| style="font-size:80%" | Died February 4, 1940 
|  | Robert K. Goodwin (R)
| March 5, 1940
|-
| 
|  | Clyde Smith (R)
| style="font-size:80%" | Died April 8, 1940 
|  | Margaret Chase Smith (R)
| June 3, 1940
|-
| 
|  | W. Benjamin Gibbs (D)
| style="font-size:80%" | Died August 7, 1940 
|  | Florence Reville Gibbs (D)
| October 1, 1940
|-
| 
|  | George N. Seger (R)
| style="font-size:80%" | Died August 26, 1940 
| colspan=2 | Vacant until the next Congress
|-
| 
|  | William B. Bankhead (D)
| style="font-size:80%" | Died September 15, 1940 
|  | Zadoc L. Weatherford (D)
| November 5, 1940
|-
| 
|  | Lindsay C. Warren (D)
| style="font-size:80%" | Resigned October 31, 1940, after being appointed Comptroller General of the United States 
|  | Herbert C. Bonner (D)
| November 5, 1940
|-
| 
|  | John Marvin Jones (D)
| style="font-size:80%" | Resigned November 20, 1940, to become judge of the United States Court of Claims 
| colspan=2 | Vacant until the next Congress
|-
| 
|  | Paul H. Maloney (D)
| style="font-size:80%" | Resigned December 15, 1940, to become Collector of Internal Revenue for New Orleans District
| colspan=2 | Vacant until the next Congress
|-
| 
|  | Monrad Wallgren (D)
| style="font-size:80%" | Resigned December 19, 1940, after being appointed to the US Senate having already been elected.
| colspan=2 | Vacant until the next Congress
|-
| 
|  | Thomas C. Hennings Jr. (D)
| style="font-size:80%" | Resigned December 31, 1940, to become candidate for Circuit attorney of St. Louis
| colspan=2 | Vacant until the next Congress
|}

Committees

Senate

 Agriculture and Forestry (Chairman: Ellison D. Smith; Ranking Member: George W. Norris)
 Aquatic Life (Special)
 Appropriations (Chairman: Carter Glass; Ranking Member: Frederick Hale)
 Audit and Control the Contingent Expenses of the Senate (Chairman: James F. Byrnes; Ranking Member: John G. Townsend Jr.)
 Banking and Currency (Chairman: Robert F. Wagner; Ranking Member: John G. Townsend Jr.)
 Campaign Expenditures Investigation (Special) (Chairman: Guy M. Gillette)
 Civil Service (Chairman: William J. Bulow; Ranking Member: Wallace H. White Jr.)
 Civil Service Laws (Special)
 Civil Service System (Special)
 Claims (Chairman: Edward R. Burke; Ranking Member: Arthur Capper)
 Commerce (Chairman: Josiah W. Bailey; Ranking Member: Charles L. McNary)
 Court Reorganization and Judicial Procedure (Special)
 District of Columbia (Chairman: William H. King; Ranking Member: Arthur Capper)
 Education and Labor (Chairman: Elbert D. Thomas; Ranking Member: William E. Borah then Robert M. La Follette Jr.)
 Investigation Violations of Free Speech and the Rights of Labor
 Enrolled Bills (Chairman: Hattie W. Caraway; Ranking Member: Arthur H. Vandenberg)
 Expenditures in Executive Departments (Chairman: Frederick Van Nuys; Ranking Member: James J. Davis)
 Finance (Chairman: Pat Harrison; Ranking Member: Robert M. La Follette Jr.)
 Foreign Relations (Chairman: Key Pittman; Ranking Member: William E. Borah then Hiram W. Johnson)
 Government Organization (Select)
 Immigration (Chairman: Richard B. Russell; Ranking Member: Hiram W. Johnson)
 Indian Affairs (Chairman: Elmer Thomas; Ranking Member: Lynn J. Frazier)
 Interoceanic Canals (Chairman: Bennett Champ Clark; Ranking Member: Styles Bridges)
 Interstate Commerce (Chairman: Burton K. Wheeler; Ranking Member: Wallace H. White Jr.)
 Irrigation and Reclamation (Chairman: John H. Bankhead II; Ranking Member: Charles L. McNary)
 Judiciary (Chairman: Henry F. Ashurst; Ranking Member: William E. Borah then George W. Norris)
 Library (Chairman: Alben W. Barkley; Ranking Member: Ernest W. Gibson then Charles L. McNary)
 Manufactures (Chairman: John H. Overton; Ranking Member: Robert M. La Follette Jr.)
 Military Affairs (Chairman: Morris Sheppard; Ranking Member: Warren R. Austin)
 Mines and Mining (Chairman: Joseph F. Guffey; Ranking Member: Lynn J. Frazier)
 Naval Affairs (Chairman: David I. Walsh; Ranking Member: Frederick Hale)
 Patents (Chairman: Homer T. Bone; Ranking Member: George W. Norris)
 Pensions (Chairman: Sherman Minton; Ranking Member: Lynn J. Frazier)
 Post Office and Post Roads (Chairman: Kenneth McKellar; Ranking Member: Lynn J. Frazier)
 Printing (Chairman: Carl Hayden; Ranking Member: Arthur H. Vandenberg)
 Privileges and Elections (Chairman: Walter F. George; Ranking Member: Warren R. Austin)
 Public Buildings and Grounds (Chairman: Tom Connally; Ranking Member: Frederick Hale)
 Public Lands and Surveys (Chairman: Alva B. Adams; Ranking Member: Gerald P. Nye)
 Rules (Chairman: Matthew M. Neely; Ranking Member: Frederick Hale)
 Senatorial Campaign Expenditures (Special)
 Small Business Enterprises (Special) 
 Taxation of Government Securities and Salaries (Special)
 Territories and Insular Affairs (Chairman: Millard E. Tydings; Ranking Member: Gerald P. Nye)
 Unemployment and Relief (Select)
 Whole
 Wildlife Resources (Special) (Chairman: Vacant; Ranking Member: Vacant)
 Wool Production (Special) (Chairman: Alva B. Adams)

House of Representatives

 Accounts (Chairman: Lindsay C. Warren; Ranking Member: James Wolfenden)
 Agriculture (Chairman: J. Marvin Jones; Ranking Member: Clifford R. Hope)
 Anthracite Emergency Program (Special)
 Appropriations (Chairman: Edward T. Taylor; Ranking Member: John Taber)
 Banking and Currency (Chairman: Henry B. Steagall; Ranking Member: Jesse P. Wolcott)
 Census (Chairman: Matthew A. Dunn; Ranking Member: J. Roland Kinzer)
 Civil Service (Chairman: Robert Ramspeck; Ranking Member: Edith Nourse Rogers)
 Claims (Chairman: Ambrose J. Kennedy; Ranking Member: Ulysses S. Guyer)
 Coinage, Weights and Measures (Chairman: Andrew Somers; Ranking Member: Clarence E. Hancock)
 Conservation of Wildlife Resources (Select) (Chairman: A. Willis Robertson)
 Disposition of Executive Papers (Chairman: Alfred J. Elliott; Ranking Member: Bertrand W. Gearhart)
 District of Columbia (Chairman: Jennings Randolph; Ranking Member: Everett Dirksen)
 Education (Chairman: William H. Larrabee; Ranking Member: George A. Dondero)
 Election of the President, Vice President and Representatives in Congress (Chairman: Caroline O'Day; Ranking Member: George H. Tinkham)
 Elections No.#1 (Chairman: Milton West; Ranking Member: Clarence E. Hancock)
 Elections No.#2 (Chairman: Joseph A. Gavagan; Ranking Member: Ulysses S. Guyer)
 Elections No.#3 (Chairman: John H. Kerr; Ranking Member: Charles L. Gifford)
 Enrolled Bills (Chairman: Claude Parsons; Ranking Member: Charles Aubrey Eaton)
 Expenditures in the Executive Departments (Chairman: John J. Cochran; Ranking Member: Charles L. Gifford)
 Flood Control (Chairman: William M. Whittington; Ranking Member: Harry Lane Englebright)
 Foreign Affairs (Chairman: Sol Bloom; Ranking Member: Hamilton Fish III)
 Government Organization (Select) (Chairman: N/A)
 Immigration and Naturalization (Chairman: Samuel Dickstein; Ranking Member: J. Will Taylor)
 Indian Affairs (Chairman: Will Rogers; Ranking Member: Fred C. Gilchrist)
 Insular Affairs (Chairman: Leo Kocialkowski; Ranking Member: Richard J. Welch)
 Interstate and Foreign Commerce (Chairman: Clarence F. Lea; Ranking Member: Carl E. Mapes)
 Invalid Pensions (Chairman: John Lesinski; Ranking Member: Owen Brewster)
 Investigate Interstate Migration of Destitute Citizens (Select) (Chairman: N/A)
 Investigate the National Labor Relations Board (Special) (Chairman: N/A)
 Irrigation and Reclamation (Chairman: Compton I. White; Ranking Member: Fred A. Hartley Jr.)
 Judiciary (Chairman: Hatton W. Sumners; Ranking Member: Ulysses S. Guyer)
 Labor (Chairman: Mary Teresa Norton; Ranking Member: Richard J. Welch)
 Library (Chairman: Kent E. Keller; Ranking Member: Allen T. Treadway)
 Memorials (Chairman: Alfred Bulwinkle; Ranking Member: Frank Crowther)
 Merchant Marine and Fisheries (Chairman: S. Otis Bland; Ranking Member: Richard J. Welch)
 Military Affairs (Chairman: Andrew J. May; Ranking Member: Walter G. Andrews)
 Mines and Mining (Chairman: Joe L. Smith; Ranking Member: Harry Lane Englebright)
 Naval Affairs (Chairman: Carl Vinson; Ranking Member: Melvin J. Maas)
 Patents (Chairman: Charles Kramer; Ranking Member: Fred A. Hartley Jr.)
 Pensions (Chairman: N/A; Ranking Member: N/A)
 Post Office and Post Roads (Chairman: N/A; Ranking Member: Fred A. Hartley Jr.)
 Printing (Chairman: N/A; Ranking Member: Robert F. Rich)
 Public Buildings and Grounds (Chairman: Fritz G. Lanham; Ranking Member: J. Will Taylor)
 Public Lands (Chairman: Rene L. DeRouen; Ranking Member: Harry Lane Englebright)
 Revision of Laws (Chairman: Eugene J. Keogh; Ranking Member: Jesse P. Wolcott)
 Rivers and Harbors (Chairman: Joseph J. Mansfield; Ranking Member: George N. Seger)
 Roads (Chairman: Wilburn Cartwright; Ranking Member: Jesse P. Wolcott)
 Rules (Chairman: Adolph J. Sabath; Ranking Member: Joseph W. Martin Jr.)
 Standards of Official Conduct
 Territories (Chairman: Robert A. Green; Ranking Member: Harry Lane Englebright)
 War Claims (Chairman: Reuben T. Wood; Ranking Member: Clare E. Hoffman)
 Ways and Means (Chairman: Robert L. Doughton; Ranking Member: Allen T. Treadway)
 World War Veterans' Legislation (Chairman: John E. Rankin; Ranking Member: Edith Nourse Rogers)
 Whole

Joint committees

 Conditions of Indian Tribes (Special)
 Disposition of (Useless) Executive Papers
 Eradication of the Mediterranean Fruit Fly
 Forestry
 The Library (Chairman: Sen. Alben W. Barkley)
 To Investigate Phosphate Resource of the United States (Chairman: N/A; Vice Chairman: Rep. J. Hardin Peterson)
 Printing (Chairman: N/A; Vice Chairman: Sen. Carl Hayden)
 Taxation (Chairman: Rep. Robert L. Doughton; Vice Chairman: Sen. Pat Harrison)
 Tennessee Valley Authority (Chairman: Sen. A. Victor Donahey; Vice Chairman: N/A)

Caucuses
 Democratic (House)
 Democratic (Senate)

Employees

Legislative branch agency directors
Architect of the Capitol: David Lynn
Attending Physician of the United States Congress: George Calver
Comptroller General of the United States: vacant, until April 11, 1939
 Fred H. Brown, April 11, 1939 - June 19, 1940
 vacant, June 19, 1940 - November 1, 1940 
 Lindsay C. Warren, from November 1, 1940
Librarian of Congress: Herbert Putnam, until 1939
 Archibald MacLeish, from 1939
Public Printer of the United States: Augustus E. Giegengack

Senate
Chaplain: ZeBarney Thorne Phillips (Episcopal)
Parliamentarian: Charles Watkins
 Secretary for the Majority: Leslie Biffle
 Secretary for the Minority: Carl A. Loeffler
Secretary: Edwin A. Halsey
Librarian: Ruskin McArdle
Sergeant at Arms: Chesley W. Jurney

House of Representatives
Chaplain: James Shera Montgomery (Methodist)
Clerk: South Trimble 
Parliamentarian: Lewis Deschler
Postmaster: Finis E. Scott
Doorkeeper: Joseph J. Sinnott
Reading Clerks: Roger M. Calloway (D) and Alney E. Chaffee (R)
Sergeant at Arms: Kenneth Romney

In popular culture
 It appears in Mr. Smith Goes to Washington.

See also 
 1938 United States elections (elections leading to this Congress)
 1938 United States Senate elections
 1938 United States House of Representatives elections
 1940 United States elections (elections during this Congress, leading to the next Congress)
 1940 United States presidential election
 1940 United States Senate elections
 1940 United States House of Representatives elections

Notes

References